Diego de Erice (born August 9, 1986, Mexico city, Mexico), is a Mexican actor. He is known for his role on the soap opera Qué pobres tan ricos.

Filmography

Theater 
Como quieras, ¡perro ámame! (2013)

References

External links 

Male actors from Mexico City
Mexican male telenovela actors
Living people
Mexican male television actors
1986 births
21st-century Mexican male actors